Cowley Beach Training Area (CBTA) is a military installation near Innisfail, Queensland, Australia. Military exercises are conducted there.

History 
The base was established in 1962, as the home for the Joint Tropical Research Unit (JTRU).

References

Military installations in Queensland
Military buildings and structures in Queensland
Australian Army bases
Barracks in Australia
Cassowary Coast Region